Chimney Rock can refer to one of the following sites in the United States and Canada:

 Chimney Rock National Historic Site, a 325-foot geological formation in Nebraska, United States
 Chimney Rock, North Carolina, United States; a village
 Chimney Rock State Park, a 315-foot granite monolith near Chimney Rock, North Carolina, United States
 Chimney Rock National Monument, a geological formation and archaeological site in southwestern Colorado, United States
 Chimney Rock (Jackson Butte), a pillar in southwest Colorado, United States
 Chimney Rock, Colorado, an unincorporated town in Archuleta County, Colorado, United States
 Chimney Rock (Colorado), a pillar in Ouray County, Colorado, United States
 Chimney Rock (Canada), a limestone monolith in Marble Canyon, British Columbia, Canada
 Chimney Rock (Capitol Reef National Park), a summit in Capitol Reef National Park in Utah, United States
 Chimney Rock (Washington), a peak in the Alpine Lakes Wilderness in Washington, United States
 Chimney Rock (Idaho), a monolith in the Selkirk Mountains in the Idaho "panhandle".
 Chimney Rock Scientific and Natural Area, a sandstone/limestone formation and protected area in Minnesota.
 Chimney Rock Winery in Napa Valley, California, United States
 Chimney Rock, next to and part of the Washington Valley Park in New Jersey, United States
 Chimney Rock, a peak in List of mountains in Mineral County, Montana, United States
 Chimney Rock, the name of five pillars in Montana, United States
 Chimney Rock (Lucerne Valley, California), a California Registered Historical Landmark in the Mojave Desert, United States
 Chimney Rock, an outcrop on the headlands of Point Reyes, California, United States
 Chimney Rock, a quartzite formation and scenic vista at Catoctin Mountain Park in northern Maryland, United States
 Chimney Rock, a rock formation near Ghost Ranch, New Mexico, United States
 Chimney Rock, a granite pillar located south of Lake Nacimiento, California, United States
 Chimney Rock, Wisconsin, a town